Gazanfar Mahmud oghlu Musabeyov or Musabekov (Perebidil, Baku Governorate - 9 February 1938, Moscow) was an Azerbaijani Bolshevik revolutionary and Soviet statesman. He was Chairman of the Central Executive Committee of the Azerbaijan SSR from 1929 to 1931, and he headed the government of the Transcaucasian SFSR from 1931 to 1936. During the Great Purge, Musabekov was arrested (June 1937), accused of plotting against the Soviet state, sentenced to death and executed on 9 February 1938, after his mother. 

An Azerbaijani cargo ship is named after him.

References 
 

Great Purge victims from Azerbaijan
Soviet Azerbaijani people
1888 births
1938 deaths
Azerbaijani communists
Bolsheviks
Executed politicians
Executive Committee of the Communist International
Azerbaijani atheists
People from Shabran District
People from Baku Governorate
Heads of government of the Transcaucasian SFSR
Members of the Communist Party of the Soviet Union executed by the Soviet Union